Eta Scuti, Latinized from η Scuti, is a single star in the southern constellation of Scutum, near the constellation border with Aquila. Eta Scuti was a latter designation of 9 Aquilae before the official constellation borders were set in 1922. It is visible to the naked eye as a faint, orange-hued star with an apparent visual magnitude of +4.83. This object is located approximately 213 light-years from the Sun based on parallax, and is drifting further away with a radial velocity of −92.

This is an aging giant star with a stellar classification of K1-III. After exhausting the supply of hydrogen at its core, the star cooled and expanded until currently it has 12 times the girth of the Sun. It is a red clump giant, which indicates it is presently on the horizontal branch and is generating energy through core helium fusion. The star is about 2.8 billion years old with 1.5 times the mass of the Sun.

References

K-type giants
Scutum (constellation)
Scuti, Eta
BD-06 4976
175751
093026
7149
TIC objects